Kantale is a town in the Trincomalee District in eastern Sri Lanka.

According to the ancient chronicle, Mahavamsa, Kantale Tank, also named "Gangathala Vapi", is credited as being built by Aggabodhi the II (606–618) and rehabilitated and developed by Parakramabahu the Great (1153–1186). 3,750 hectares. Constructed for the irrigation of crops in this arid region, its source of water is the Mahaweli River, the longest in the island, which flows out to the sea at Trincomalee.

One of the oldest tanks in Sri Lanka, the Kantale Tank gives water to a vast area for paddy and sugar cane plantations as well as for human consumption in Trincomalee and the adjoining areas.

See also
Kantale Hospital

References

Towns in Trincomalee District
Kantalai DS Division